Dallas DNA is an American television program that premiered on April 28, 2009, on the Investigation Discovery cable channel. It documents the cooperation of the Dallas County, Texas District Attorney's Office with several law school innocence programs and their revue of over 400 cases. The new division, the Conviction Integrity Unit, re-investigates past convictions where DNA testing may either exonerate or confirm convictions of those now serving time in Texas prisons.

Cast
The cast includes real-life officials in their daily work, including but not limited to:
Craig Watkins, District Attorney
Terri Moore, 1st Assistant D.A.
Mike Ware, Special Fields Bureau Chief and Chief of the CIU.
Jena Parker, Paralegal
James Hammond, Investigator
Michelle Moore, Public Defender's Office – DNA Attorney.
Other judges, attorneys, investigators, witnesses, family, and friends of both the accused and of the victims of the crimes.

See also
List of miscarriage of justice cases
Overturned convictions in the United States
List of wrongful convictions in the United States

External links
Dallas DNA  official website

Dallas DNA  at the Texas District and County Attorneys Association

2009 American television series debuts
Criminal justice
Overturned convictions in the United States
Investigation Discovery original programming
Television shows set in Dallas
2009 American television series endings